Ian Clarke (born 20 March 1944) is an Australian gymnast. He competed in seven events at the 1972 Summer Olympics.

References

External links
 

1944 births
Living people
Australian male artistic gymnasts
Olympic gymnasts of Australia
Gymnasts at the 1972 Summer Olympics
Place of birth missing (living people)